Reinaldo Verdes Drake (born March 15, 1923), sometimes spelled "Dreke", is a Cuban former Negro league outfielder who played in the 1940s.

A native of Havana, Cuba, Drake made his Negro leagues debut in 1945 with the Cincinnati Clowns. He remained with the club when it moved to Indianapolis the following season, played with the Clowns through 1954, and was selected to the East–West All-Star Game in 1953. Drake later played minor league baseball with the Yakima Braves.

References

External links
 and Baseball-Reference Black Baseball stats and Seamheads

1923 births
Possibly living people
Indianapolis Clowns players
Baseball players from Havana
Baseball outfielders
Cuban expatriates in the United States